The 1949 Mississippi State Maroons football team represented Mississippi State College as a member of the Southeastern Conference (SEC) during the 1949 college football season. In their first season under new head coach Arthur Morton, the Maroons compiled an overall record of 0–8–1 and finished last of 12 teams in the SEC with a conference mark of  0–6. Mississippi State failed to score more than seven points in any game all season.

Schedule

References

Mississippi State
Mississippi State Bulldogs football seasons
College football winless seasons
Mississippi State Maroons football